The Longford County Board of the Gaelic Athletic Association (GAA) or Longford GAA is one of the 32 county boards of the GAA in Ireland, and is responsible for Gaelic games in County Longford. The county board is also responsible for the Longford county teams.

The county football team won its only National Football League title in 1966 with a one-point victory over Galway in the Home Final and an aggregate win over New York in the Final. The team won its only Leinster Senior Football Championship title in 1968, with a 3-9 to 1-4 win over Laois.

Clubs
The county board oversees 21 GAA clubs, the lowest number of any county in Ireland. The current total of 21 clubs is down from 24 in 2009 which at the time was the smallest in the country, below Sligo, which had 26 back then and now has 23 clubs.

(H): Hurling (F) Football (D) Dual

 Abbeylara (F)
 Ardagh Moydow (F)
 Ballymahon (F)
 Ballymore (F)
 Carrickedmond (F)
 Cashel (F)
 Clonguish (D)
 Colmcille (F)
 Dromard (F)
 Fr. Manning Gaels (F)
 Grattan Óg (F)
 Kenagh (F)
 Killoe Young Emmets (F)
 Legan Sarsfields (F)
 Longford Slashers (D)
 Mostrim (D)
 Mullinalaghta St Columba's (F)
 Rathcline (F)
 Seán Connollys (F)
 St. Brigid's Killashee (F)
 St. Mary's Granard (F)

Three hurling clubs exist within the above list of 21 GAA clubs.
 
 Clonguish Gaels
 Longford Slashers
 Wolfe Tones (Mostrim)

Football

Clubs

12 clubs contest the Longford Senior Football Championship.

Colmcille are the current Longford Senior Football champions (as of 2022).

Mullinalaghta St Columba's won the Leinster Senior Club Football Championship in 2018.

County team

Longford won the National Football League in 1966, then the 1968 Leinster Senior Football Championship. The county has never won the All-Ireland Senior Football Championship.

Hurling

Clubs

3 clubs contest the Longford Senior Hurling Championship.

Clonguish are the current Longford Senior Hurling champions (as of 2022).

County team
Like most of its neighbours, Longford have struggled to compete with the bigger counties as they only have three Hurling teams in the county, Slashers, Wolfe Tones and Clonguish. The county team won the National League Division 3 title in 2002, In 2005 & 2006 they won the Leinster Shield. They won the Lory Meagher Cup, for the first time, in Croke Park on 3 July 2010 and won on a scoreline 1 – 20 to Donegal 1 – 12.

Liam Griffin has said the GAA should be ashamed of itself over its failure in the promotion of hurling.

Hurling Honours

Championship Titles
 Lory Meagher Cup: (2)
 Champions (2): 2010, 2014
 Runners-Up (2): 2013, 2022
 All Ireland Minor C Championship (2)
 1997, 2000
 All Ireland Juvenile C Championship (2)
 1982, 1984

League Titles
 National Hurling League Division 3 (1)
 2002
 National Hurling League Division 3B (3)
 2013, 2017, 2019
 National Hurling League Division 4 (2)
1984, 1998
 All Ireland Minor Hurling League Division 3 (1)
 1997 ?

Provincial Cups & Shields
 Kehoe Cup (1)
 2018
 Leinster Junior Hurling Shield (2)
 2005, 2006

Other
U16 All Ireland Winners (2013) ?

(This honours section is incomplete)

Ladies' football

Longford have the following achievements in ladies' football.

 All-Ireland Junior Ladies' Football Championships: 2
 1997, 2017

(This honours section is incomplete)

Camogie
Under Camogie's National Development Plan 2010-2015, "Our Game, Our Passion," new camogie clubs were to be established in Longford and a county board formed by 2015. There are currently no active Camogie clubs in competition in Longford.

References

External links

 Longford GAA site
 Longford Gaelic Stats site
 Longford on Hoganstand.com

 
Gaelic games governing bodies in Leinster
Leinster GAA
Sport in County Longford